Vladimir Zagorodniy; born 27 June 1981 in Simferopol, Soviet Union) is a Ukrainian (until 2014) and Russian (since 2015) road bicycle racer. He was professional from 2007 to 2015.

Major results

2005
 3rd Giro della Valsesia 2
 8th Cronoscalata Internazionale Gardone
2006
 1st  Road race, National Road Championships
 1st  Overall Giro della Provincia di Cosenza
1st Stage 2
2007
 1st  Road race, National Road Championships
 3rd Trofeo Melinda
 3rd Coppa Placci
 7th Trofeo Matteotti
2008
 1st Stage 5 Tour of Qinghai Lake
 1st Stage 1 (ITT) Giro del Trentino
 3rd Road race, National Road Championships
 3rd GP Industria & Commercio di Prato
2009
 4th Road race, National Road Championships
 10th Overall Tour of Hainan
2012
 1st Stage 5 Tour of Borneo
 10th Overall Jelajah Malaysia
2013
 3rd Road race, National Road Championships
 8th Overall Tour of Romania
1st Prologue (TTT)
 9th Overall Tour of Hainan
2014
 7th Race Horizon Park 1

References

External links
 Volodymyr Zagorodniy
 LA SQUADRA
 

Ukrainian male cyclists
1981 births
Living people
Sportspeople from Simferopol
Naturalised citizens of Russia
Russian male cyclists